Jonathan Tabu (born October 7, 1985) is a Belgian professional basketball player for Vanoli Cremona of the Italian Serie A2. Tabu also represents Belgium in international competition.

Professional career
In 2004 Tabu made the team of Spirou Charleroi, while he also played for the second division team CPH Spirou Gilly. He would win three Belgian Championships with Spirou. He also played in the ULEB Cup/EuroCup with Spirou.

In 2010 Tabu signed with the Serie A team Cantù. In the 2011–12 season he played on loan for Vanoli Cremona. In the 2012–13 season he played in the EuroLeague with Cantù, on November 11 he scored a career high 17 points against Panathinaikos.

For the 2013–14 season Tabu signed in Spain with CAI Zaragoza.

On August 4, 2014, Tabu signed a contract with Alba Berlin. On April 28, 2015, he left Alba and signed with Italian club Emporio Armani Milano for the rest of the 2014–15 Serie A season.

On July 28, 2015, Tabu signed with Fuenlabrada. One year later, he moved to Bilbao Basket.

On November 2, 2018, he has signed with Le Mans Sarthe of the French LNB Pro A. 

On July 2, 2019, he has signed with ESSM Le Portel of the French LNB Pro A. 

On July 21, 2020, he has signed with Baxi Manresa of the Liga ACB. Tabu averaged 7.3 points and 3.5 assists per game. On December 8, 2021, he signed with Champagne Châlons-Reims of the LNB Pro A. Tabu averaged 3.0 points, 3.5 assists, and 1.3 rebounds per game in four games.

On February 3, 2022, he has signed with Limburg United of the BNXT League.

On October 3, 2022, he has signed with Circus Brussels of the BNXT League.

On November 3, 2022, he signed with Vanoli Cremona of the Italian Serie A2.

International career
He represented Belgium at the EuroBasket 2015 where they lost to Greece in eighth finals with 75–54. Over 6 tournament games, he averaged 10.0 points, 2.3 rebounds and 2.5 assists.

Tabu also played at EuroBasket 2022. On September 1, he scored a game-winning three pointer to give Belgium a 79–76 overtime win over Georgia.

References

External links
Jonathan Tabu at acb.com 
Jonathan Tabu at legabasket.it
Jonathan Tabu at eurobasket.com
Jonathan Tabu at euroleague.net
Jonathan Tabu at fiba.com

1985 births
Living people
Alba Berlin players
Baloncesto Fuenlabrada players
Basket Zaragoza players
Bàsquet Manresa players
Belgian expatriate basketball people in France
Belgian expatriate basketball people in Germany
Belgian expatriate basketball people in Spain
Belgian people of Democratic Republic of the Congo descent
Belgian men's basketball players
Belgium national basketball players
Bilbao Basket players
Brussels Basketball players
Democratic Republic of the Congo expatriate basketball people in Belgium
Democratic Republic of the Congo expatriate basketball people in Germany
Democratic Republic of the Congo expatriate basketball people in Italy
Democratic Republic of the Congo expatriate basketball people in Spain
Democratic Republic of the Congo men's basketball players
ESSM Le Portel players
Expatriate basketball people in France
Expatriate basketball people in Italy
Le Mans Sarthe Basket players
Lega Basket Serie A players
Liga ACB players
Olimpia Milano players
Pallacanestro Cantù players
Point guards
Shooting guards
Spirou Charleroi players
Basketball players from Kinshasa
Vanoli Cremona players